Zastînca is a village in Soroca District, Moldova.

References

Villages of Soroca District
Populated places on the Dniester